The Front Line was a 1984/1985 BBC sitcom about two half-brothers of West Indian descent who shared a house, one brother a policeman and one a dreadlocked Rastafarian.

The series starred Paul Barber as the elder, policeman brother Malcolm, and Alan Igbon as the younger brother Sheldon. It was written by Alex Shearer, filmed in Bristol and Cardiff, and transmitted between 6 December 1984 and 17 January 1985. A pilot for the series, On The Frontline, was broadcast in the 1970s.

The theme tune to the series was written and performed by Black Roots, and the opening credits of the show featured the band performing the song.

References

1984 British television series debuts
1985 British television series endings
1980s British sitcoms
BBC television sitcoms